The 2022–23 UT Rio Grande Valley Vaqueros men's basketball team represented the University of Texas Rio Grande Valley in the 2022–23 NCAA Division I men's basketball season. The Vaqueros, led by second-year head coach Matt Figger, played their home games at the UTRGV Fieldhouse in Edinburg, Texas, as members of the Western Athletic Conference.

Previous season
The Vaqueros finished the 2021–22 season 8–23, 3–15 in WAC play to finish in a tie for eleventh place. In the WAC tournament, they were defeated by California Baptist in the first round.

Roster

Schedule and results

|-
!colspan=12 style=| Exhibition

|-
!colspan=12 style=| Regular season

|-
!colspan=9 style=| WAC tournament

|-

Sources

References

UT Rio Grande Valley Vaqueros men's basketball seasons
Texas–Rio Grande Valley Vaqueros
Texas–Rio Grande Valley Vaqueros men's basketball
Texas–Rio Grande Valley Vaqueros men's basketball